The Hong Kong Amateur Radio Transmitting Society (HARTS) is an organization representing a majority of the amateur radio operators in Hong Kong. HARTS is a charitable institution recognized by the Inland Revenue Department since early 2008. HARTS was established in the Oct 1929, when Hong Kong was a dependent territory of the United Kingdom. HARTS is the member society representing Hong Kong in the International Amateur Radio Union.

The organization's primary mission is to popularize and promote amateur radio in Hong Kong. HARTS operates and maintains beacons and repeaters at Tai Mo Shan, Tate's Cairn, Victoria Peak, and Tin Shui Wai. The organization has provided communications support for charitable groups and events, and has formed a support network for amateur radio emergency communications. One membership benefit of the organization is a QSL bureau for members who regularly make communications with amateur radio operators in other countries.

See also 
Associação dos Radioamadores de Macau
Chinese Radio Sports Association
Chinese Taipei Amateur Radio League

References 

Hong Kong
Clubs and societies in Hong Kong
1930s establishments in Hong Kong
Organizations established in the 1930s
Radio in Hong Kong